Harry Hamm Wickwire (June 21, 1868 – November 26, 1922) was a lawyer and political figure in Nova Scotia, Canada. He represented Kings County in the Nova Scotia House of Assembly from 1894 to 1922 as a Liberal member.

He was born in Canning, Nova Scotia, the son of J. L. Wickwire and a descendant of Planter's, and was educated at Acadia College and Dalhousie College. In 1895, he married Sarah J. Lovitt. Wickwire served as Crown Attorney for Kings County.

References 
The Canadian parliamentary companion, 1897, JA Gemmill

1868 births
1922 deaths
Nova Scotia Liberal Party MLAs